

The Progreso Port of Entry was opened in July, 1952, with the completion of the Progreso – Nuevo Progreso International Bridge.  The original US Border Inspection Station was replaced by the General Services Administration in 1983, and the bridge itself was rebuilt in 2003.

See also

 List of Mexico–United States border crossings
 List of Canada–United States border crossings

References

1952 establishments in Texas
Buildings and structures in Hidalgo County, Texas
Mexico–United States border crossings
Buildings and structures completed in 1952